The 2008 Bavarian state election was held on 28 September 2008 to elect the members of the Landtag of Bavaria. The result was a historic defeat for the Christian Social Union (CSU), which had governed with a majority uninterrupted since 1962, and had won over 60% of the vote in the 2003 election. Despite polling suggesting that the party would retain its majority with losses, it suffered a 17% swing and came up two seats short of a majority, its worst result since 1954. Minister-President and CSU leader Günther Beckstein subsequently resigned from both posts, and the Landtag elected Horst Seehofer as his successor after the CSU and Free Democratic Party (FDP) came to a coalition agreement.

The Free Voters of Bavaria entered the Landtag for the first time with 10% of the vote; the FDP also won seats for the first time in 14 years. The Left competed in its first Bavarian election, recording a modest result of 4.3%, but failing to win any seats.

Parties
The table below lists parties represented in the 15th Landtag of Bavaria.

Opinion polling

Election result

|-
! colspan="2" | Party
! Votes
! %
! +/-
! Seats 
! +/-
! Seats %
|-
| bgcolor=| 
| align=left | Christian Social Union (CSU)
| align=right| 4,603,960
| align=right| 43.4
| align=right| 17.3
| align=right| 92
| align=right| 32
| align=right| 49.2
|-
| bgcolor=| 
| align=left | Social Democratic Party (SPD)
| align=right| 1,972,437
| align=right| 18.6
| align=right| 1.0
| align=right| 39
| align=right| 2
| align=right| 20.9
|-
| bgcolor=#007E82| 
| align=left | Free Voters of Bavaria (FW)
| align=right| 1,085,896
| align=right| 10.2
| align=right| 6.2
| align=right| 21
| align=right| 21
| align=right| 11.5
|-
| bgcolor=| 
| align=left | Alliance 90/The Greens (Grüne)
| align=right| 999,111
| align=right| 9.4
| align=right| 1.7
| align=right| 19
| align=right| 4
| align=right| 10.2
|-
| bgcolor=| 
| align=left | Free Democratic Party (FDP)
| align=right| 847,227
| align=right| 8.0
| align=right| 5.4
| align=right| 16
| align=right| 16
| align=right| 8.6
|-
! colspan=8|
|-
| bgcolor=| 
| align=left | The Left (Linke)
| align=right| 461,755
| align=right| 4.3
| align=right| New
| align=right| 0
| align=right| New
| align=right| 0
|-
| bgcolor=| 
| align=left | Ecological Democratic Party (ÖDP)
| align=right| 212,200
| align=right| 2.0
| align=right| 0.0
| align=right| 0
| align=right| ±0
| align=right| 0
|-
| bgcolor=| 
| align=left | The Republicans (REP)
| align=right| 146,073
| align=right| 1.4
| align=right| 0.9
| align=right| 0
| align=right| ±0
| align=right| 0
|-
| bgcolor=| 
| align=left | National Democratic Party (NPD)
| align=right| 123,399
| align=right| 1.2
| align=right| 1.2
| align=right| 0
| align=right| ±0
| align=right| 0
|-
| bgcolor=#386ABC| 
| align=left | Bavaria Party (BP)
| align=right| 116,464
| align=right| 1.1
| align=right| 0.3
| align=right| 0
| align=right| ±0
| align=right| 0
|-
| 
| align=left | Pensioners' Party (RRP)
| align=right| 19,760
| align=right| 0.2
| align=right| New
| align=right| 0
| align=right| New
| align=right| 0
|-
| 
| align=left | The Violets (Violetten)
| align=right| 15,465
| align=right| 0.1
| align=right| New
| align=right| 0
| align=right| New
| align=right| 0
|-
| 
| align=left | Citizens' Bloc (BB)
| align=right| 7,306
| align=right| 0.1
| align=right| 0.0
| align=right| 0
| align=right| ±0
| align=right| 0
|-
| 
| align=left | Civil Rights Movement Solidarity (BüSo)
| align=right| 1,222
| align=right| 0.0
| align=right| 0.1
| align=right| 0
| align=right| ±0
| align=right| 0
|-
! align=right colspan=2| Total
! align=right| 10,612,275
! align=right| 100.0
! align=right| 
! align=right| 187
! align=right| 7
! align=right| 
|-
! align=right colspan=2| Voter turnout
! align=right| 
! align=right| 58.1
! align=right| 1.0
! align=right| 
! align=right| 
! align=right| 
|}

See also
2003 Bavaria state election

Notes

References

External links
 Official results 
 Article by Frankfurter Allgemeine Zeitung 

2008 elections in Germany
2008
2008 in Bavaria
September 2008 events in Europe